Vilmos Rácz (March 31, 1889 – July 18, 1976) was a Hungarian athlete.  He competed at the 1908 Summer Olympics in London and at the 1912 Summer Olympics in Stockholm.

In the 100 metres, Rácz took second place in his first round heat with a time of 11.4 seconds.  He did not advance to the semifinals.

His result in the preliminary heats of the 200 metres was no different, with his time of 23.3 seconds putting him second in his heat again.

References

Sources
 
 
 

1889 births
1976 deaths
Athletes from Budapest
Athletes (track and field) at the 1908 Summer Olympics
Athletes (track and field) at the 1912 Summer Olympics
Olympic athletes of Hungary
Hungarian male sprinters